Ída Marín Hermannsdóttir (born 13 July 2002) is an Icelandic footballer who plays as a midfielder and forward for Valur and the Iceland national team.

International career
Ída Marín made her debut for the Iceland national team on 30 November 2021, coming on as a substitute for Dagný Brynjarsdóttir in the match against Cyprus.

Personal life
Ída Marín is the daughter of former footballers Hermann Hreiðarsson and Ragna Lóa Stefánsdóttir, both of whom represented Iceland at international level.

References

2002 births
Living people
Women's association football midfielders
Women's association football forwards
Icelandic women's footballers
Iceland women's international footballers
Fylkir women's football players
Valur (women's football) players
Úrvalsdeild kvenna (football) players